Messalina is a 1960 Italian peplum film directed by Vittorio Cottafavi.

Plot
After the death of the Emperor Caligula, Claudius is chosen to replace him. Claudius decides to take a new wife, the Vestal Virgin Messalina, the niece of Augustus Caesar.

The night before the wedding Messalina murders a noble via poison. An assassin is sent to kill Messalina; she seduces him, has him killed and presents his severed head.

Cast 
 Belinda Lee as Valeria Messalina
 Spiros Focás as Lucius Maximus
 Carlo Giustini as Lucius Geta (as Carlo Justini)  
 Giancarlo Sbragia as Aulo Celso (as Gian Carlo Sbragia)
 Arturo Dominici as Gaius Lilius 
 Giulio Donnini as Narcissus 
 Ida Galli as Silvia
 Mino Doro as Claudius 
 Giuliano Gemma as Marcellus 
 Annie Gorassini as Courtisan lover of Aulo Ceso
 Lia Angeleri as Vipidia
 Aroldo Tieri as Pirgo Pollinice  
 Vittorio Congia as Ortotrago
 Paola Pitagora (as Paola Gargeloni)
 Bruno Scipioni

Production
Belinda Lee's casting was announced in July 1959.

Messalina was shot at Cinecitta Studios in Rome in November-December 1959.

It was the first notable role for Giuliano Gemma.

Release
Messalina was released in Italy on 12 March 1960 with a 96-minute running time. It was released in the United States in 1962 with an 84-minute running time.

Reception
FilmInk called the film "The most fun of Lee’s European movies", "a silly sword and sandal epic with Lee having a high old time as the notorious empress, taking milk baths and seducing gladiators."

Film critic Gary Smith wrote that:
Of the many screen interpretations of Messalina this is probably the most satisfying due to the casting of Belinda Lee in the title role. This is not to suggest that Messalina is the most historically accurate or even the best produced version, but Belinda Lee’s pagan beauty seems to exude wantonness, and this is just the right quality needed for a successful portrayal of Rome’s most dissolute em- press. Lee, who played a number of memorable screen temptresses in her brief film career, including Lucretia Borgia in The Nights of Lucretia Borgia and Potiphar’s wife in Joseph and His Brethren, had beauty and charisma.

References

Bibliography

External links

Messalina at BFI
Messalina at Letterbox DVD
1960 films
1960s historical films
1960s biographical films
Italian biographical films
Peplum films
Films directed by Vittorio Cottafavi
Films set in ancient Rome
Films set in the Roman Empire
Films set in the 1st century
Cultural depictions of Messalina
Cultural depictions of Claudius
Films scored by Angelo Francesco Lavagnino
Sword and sandal films
1960s Italian-language films
1960s Italian films